Richard Blais (born February 12, 1972) is an American chef, television personality, restaurateur, and author. He appeared on the reality show cooking show Top Chef, and is known for his take on classic American cuisine. Blais was the runner-up for the fourth season of Top Chef and returned several seasons later to win Top Chef: All-Stars.

Education and early career

Blais was born in Uniondale, New York. He was adopted by his stepfather in the second grade. In 1982, as a pitcher for his "Franks Pizza" Little League team, Richard came in to pitch the final playoff game of the season with his team down by two runs. He managed to no-hit the mighty "Sunocco" team for the next five innings as his squad scored three runs to win the game. Blais' first cooking job was in a McDonald's on Long Island, where he learned the basics of working in a kitchen. Coming from humble beginnings, Blais dreamed of reinventing himself as a sophisticated Manhattanite. After moving on to a couple of upscale restaurants while in college, he received the 2-year AOS in culinary arts from The Culinary Institute of America.  After graduation, he was invited to complete a fellowship in the fish kitchen. He has studied under chefs Thomas Keller at The French Laundry, Daniel Boulud, and Ferran Adrià.  He also trained at restaurants Chez Panisse and elBulli.

Career

A native New Yorker, Blais relocated to Atlanta, Georgia, in 2000 to run his own restaurant called Fishbone. Initially, he was unimpressed with traditionally Southern ingredients but found ways to elevate them in his own style. He founded Trail Blais, a creative culinary company that has consulted on, designed, and operated some of Atlanta's most popular eateries.

In July 2011, Blais signed a cookbook deal with Clarkson Potter, a division of Random House. On February 26, he released his debut cookbook, Try This at Home: Recipes From My Head to Your Plate, an effort to make a simplified approach to adventurous cooking and offers new flavor combinations for home cooks to reinvent classic dishes. Try This at Home was nominated for a James Beard Foundation Award 2014 in the category of Cookbook: General Cooking. Blais later opened Juniper & Ivy with Michael Rosen in San Diego, California, his first West Coast venture, where he showcases an innovative approach to California cuisine. He and Michael most recently opened Crack Shack, a fine-casual fried chicken concept with a menu built around chicken and eggs. Crack Shack has multiple locations in Southern California and Las Vegas.

On May 16, 2017, Blais released his second cookbook, So Good: 100 Recipes from My Kitchen to Yours, which features 100 elevated traditional recipes designed for the home cook.

Also in 2017, Blais began hosting a weekly podcast about the culinary industry called Starving For Attention.

In 2020, Blais and iHeartRadio launched the game-show-style podcast "Food Court with Richard Blais", which features guests including celebrity chefs, actors, writers, comedians, and other podcasters debating classic food arguments.

Top Chef 

Blais appeared as a contestant on the 4th season of Bravo's Top Chef. In 2010, he competed in Top Chef: All-Stars and won the competition, earning the title of "Top Chef" by defeating Mike Isabella in the season finale, which aired on March 30, 2011. He was a recurring judge in seasons 12 and 13 and on Season 18, Top Chef: Portland.

Other television appearances

Blais is a regular on the Food Network, with recurring appearances on Guy's Grocery Games as a judge, and as a competitor, and has also hosted Food Network's Hungry Games, and Halloween Baking Championship. He competed in the second Cutthroat Kitchen: Superstar Sabotage tournament on November 4, 2015, winning his preliminary match and advancing to the finals; he had been a recurring judge on that series since season 12. He also has a recurring role as a judge in the Masterchef and Masterchef Junior franchises.  In 2015, Blais was the host of HLN's "Cook Your Ass Off,", a transformational culinary contest that focused on healthy cooking competition. In 2017 he became the host of "Man v. Master," a culinary competition on the FYI Network. Richard has also appeared on various talk shows, including The Today Show, Good Morning America, The Rachael Ray Show, The Chew, Live! with Kelly and Michael, and Late Night with Jimmy Fallon. Blais had a cameo role in the 2016 feature film, Why Him?, starring James Franco and Bryan Cranston. In 2018, Blais appeared as a guest judge on Sugar Rush. He was most recently a judge on Gordon Ramsay's Next Level Chef.

Restaurants

Blais is currently or has been involved with the following:

Juniper & Ivy – An American restaurant that opened in San Diego on March 3, 2014. At Juniper & Ivy, Blais offers refined, American cuisine with a "left coast edge." The restaurant was designed by The Johnson Studio at Cooper Carry.
The Crack Shack – Blais partnered with chef Jon Sloan and Michael Rosen on this second San Diego-based restaurant, which opened in late 2015. The restaurant "serves breakfast, lunch, and dinner via an all-day menu that revolves around chicken and eggs, from fried to grilled and everything in between." Crack Shack plans to expand to multiple locations throughout California including Orange County and Los Angeles.
FLIP Burger Boutique – Blais was formerly involved with and co-founder of burger-focused restaurant FLIP Burger Boutique, with three locations in Atlanta, one in Birmingham (closed), and a location in Nashville, Tennessee (closed). Blais is no longer involved with the FLIP chain.
Ember & Rye – Blais has been named as the chef for a restaurant scheduled to open at the Park Hyatt Aviara Resort in Carlsbad, CA. The restaurant is part of the property's $50 million renovation project.
Four Flamingos, A Richard Blais Florida Kitchen — Blais’ newest restaurant project, which opened in December 2021 at Hyatt Regency Grand Cypress in Orlando, Florida.

Other activities

In November 2011, Blais ran the ING New York City marathon for Alliance for a Healthier Generation. It was his first marathon, and he completed it in 4:31:54. He has since run four other New York City marathons. In November 2017, Blais ran the TCS New York City Marathon for Room to Read.

References

Works cited

External links

 Bravo TV biography

Living people
1972 births
American male chefs
American chefs
People from Uniondale, New York
Writers from Atlanta
Top Chef winners
Top Chef contestants
Restaurant groups in the United States
Culinary Institute of America alumni